Mungra Badshahpur is a constituency of the Uttar Pradesh Legislative Assembly covering the city of Mungra Badshahpur in the Jaunpur district of Uttar Pradesh, India.

Mungra Badshahpur is one of five assembly constituencies in the Jaunpur Lok Sabha constituency. Since 2008, this assembly constituency is numbered 368 amongst 403 constituencies.

Election results

2022

2017
Bahujan Samaj Party candidate Sushma Patel won in 2017 Uttar Pradesh Legislative Elections by defeating Bharatiya Janta Party candidate Seema Dwivedi by a margin of 5,920 votes.

References

External links
 

Assembly constituencies of Uttar Pradesh
Politics of Jaunpur district